Robert Anthony Eagleson Gordon  (born 9 February 1952) is a former British Ambassador to Burma (1995 - 1999) and Vietnam (2003 - 2007).

Gordon was educated at The King's School, Canterbury and Magdalen College, Oxford. He joined Her Majesty's Diplomatic Service in 1973. He served in Warsaw, Santiago and Paris before his ambassadors' appointments.

References

1952 births
Living people
People educated at The King's School, Canterbury
Alumni of Magdalen College, Oxford
Knights Commander of the Order of St Michael and St George
Ambassadors of the United Kingdom to Myanmar
Ambassadors of the United Kingdom to Vietnam